The 2019–20 season was Kilmarnock's seventh season in the Premiership, and their 27th consecutive season in the top flight of Scottish football. 

Kilmarnock also competed in UEFA competition for the first time in 18 years after finishing in third the previous season.

Overview
Killie began the season managed by Angelo Alessio who joined the club on 16 June 2019 after former manager Steve Clarke was signed by the Scotland national football team. On 28 June 2019, the club travelled to Spain for a pre-season training camp in Marbella as they prepared for their upcoming 2019–20 UEFA Europa League qualifiers.

The draw for the first qualifying round was held on 18 June 2019 with Kilmarnock drawn to face Welsh side Connah's Quay Nomads. The first leg was played in Wales on 11 July 2019 before Kilmarnock hosted the second leg on 18 July 2019. Connah's Quay's home ground, Deeside Stadium did not meet UEFA requirements so the game was instead played at Rhyl's home ground Belle Vue. Attempts had been made to play the game at Wrexham's Racecourse Ground in order to facilitate the expected number of supporters but the pitch works meant that wasn't possible. After a 2–1 comeback win in Wales, Kilmarnock lost 2–0 at Rugby Park and were knocked out by the Welsh part-timers 3–2 on aggregate.

Kilmarnock played Rangers at home in their first league fixture on Sunday 4 August 2019. The fixture was a repeat of the last match of the previous season which Kilmarnock won 2–1.

As a result of their European qualification, Kilmarnock received a bye to the League Cup second round. The draw was made on 28 July 2019 and Kilmarnock were drawn to play Premiership rivals Hamilton Academical on 17 August 2019. They lost to Hibernian on penalties in the following round.

In December 2019, Alex Dyer was made caretaker manager of Kilmarnock after Alessio was sacked. After three games in caretaker charge, Dyer was appointed Kilmarnock manager to the end of the 2019–20 season. 

In January 2020, Kilmarnock entered the Scottish Cup in the fourth round  where they defeated Queen's Park 6–0. In the fifth round, they lost 4–3 after extra time in a replay against Aberdeen.

On 13 March 2020 – with Kilmarnock eight in the table after a 1–0 loss to Hamilton Academical – all SPFL leagues were indefinitely suspended due to the COVID-19 pandemic. 

In June 2020, manager Alex Dyer signed a permanent two-year contract with Kilmarnock.

Match results

Pre-season and friendlies

Premiership

Scottish Cup

League Cup

Europa League

Club statistics

Competition Overview

League table

Squad statistics

Source:

Player transfers

Transfers in

Transfers out

Notes

References

Kilmarnock F.C. seasons
Kilmarnock